Alanis Nadine Morissette (born June 1, 1974) is a  Canadian-American singer, songwriter, and actress. Known for her emotive mezzo-soprano voice and confessional songwriting, Morissette began her career in Canada in the early 1990s with two dance-pop albums. In 1995, she released Jagged Little Pill, an alternative rock-oriented album with elements of post-grunge, which sold more than 33 million copies globally and is her most critically acclaimed work to date. It earned her the Grammy Award for Album of the Year in 1996 and has been made into a rock musical of the same name in 2017, which earned fifteen Tony Award nominations, including Best Musical. The album was also listed in the 2003 and 2020 editions of Rolling Stone's 500 Greatest Albums of All Time Guide. The lead single, "You Oughta Know", was also included at #103 in their 500 Greatest Songs of All Time. A highly anticipated, more experimental follow-up, electronic-infused album, Supposed Former Infatuation Junkie, was released in 1998.

Morissette assumed creative control and production duties for her subsequent studio albums, including Under Rug Swept (2002), So-Called Chaos (2004), Flavors of Entanglement (2008), Havoc and Bright Lights (2012), and Such Pretty Forks in the Road (2020). Her latest album, The Storm Before the Calm, which features ambient music, was released in 2022. Her well-known singles "You Oughta Know", "Hand in My Pocket", "Ironic", "You Learn", "Head Over Feet", "Uninvited", "Thank U", and "Hands Clean" reached top 40 in the major charts around the world, including ten top-40 hits in the UK, 3
three top-10 in the US and Australia, and twelve top-10 hits in her native Canada. She also holds the record for the most No. 1s on the weekly Billboard Alternative Songs chart for any female soloist, group leader, or duo member. She is listed on VH1's 1999 "100 Greatest Women of Rock and Roll" at number 53.

Morissette has won seven Grammy Awards, fourteen Juno Awards, one Brit Award, and has sold more than 75 million records worldwide. She has been dubbed the "Queen of Alt-Rock Angst" by Rolling Stone.

Early life 
Morissette was born June 1, 1974, at Riverside Hospital in Ottawa, Ontario, Canada to teacher Georgia Mary Ann ( Feuerstein) and high-school principal and French teacher Alan Richard Morissette. She has two brothers: older brother Chad is a business entrepreneur, and twin brother (12 minutes older) Wade Morissette is a musician. Her father is of French and Irish descent, whereas her mother has Hungarian and Jewish ancestry. Her parents were teachers in a military school and due to their work often had to move. Between the ages of three and six she lived with her parents in Lahr (Black Forest), West Germany.

When she was six years old, she returned to Ottawa and started to play the piano. In 1981, at the age of seven, she began taking dance lessons. Morissette had a Catholic upbringing. She attended Holy Family Catholic School for elementary school and Immaculata High School for Grades 7 and 8 before graduating from high school at Glebe Collegiate Institute. She appeared on the children's television sketch comedy You Can't Do That on Television for five episodes when she was in junior high school. Alanis composed her first song at the age of 10.

Music career

1987–1992: Alanis and Now Is the Time 
Morissette recorded her first demo called "Fate Stay with Me", produced by Lindsay Thomas Morgan at Marigold Studios in Toronto, and engineered by Rich Dodson of Canadian classic rock band The Stampeders. A second demo tape was recorded on cassette in August 1989 and sent to Geffen Records, but the tape has never been heard as it was stolen, among other records, in a burglary of the label's headquarters in October 1989.

In 1991, MCA Records Canada released Morissette's debut album, Alanis, in Canada only. Morissette co-wrote every track on the album with its producer, Leslie Howe. The dance-pop album went platinum, and its first single, "Too Hot", reached the top 20 on the RPM singles chart. Subsequent singles "Walk Away" and "Feel Your Love" reached the top 40. Morissette's popularity, style of music and appearance, particularly that of her hair, led her to become known as the Debbie Gibson of Canada; comparisons to Tiffany were also common. During the same period, she was a concert opening act for rapper Vanilla Ice. Morissette was nominated for three 1992 Juno Awards: Most Promising Female Vocalist of the Year (which she won), Single of the Year and Best Dance Recording (both for "Too Hot").

In 1992, she released her second album, Now Is the Time, a ballad-driven record that featured less glitzy production than Alanis and contained more thoughtful lyrics. Morissette wrote the songs with the album's producer, Leslie Howe, and Serge Côté. She said of the album, "People could go, 'Boo, hiss, hiss, this girl's like another Tiffany or whatever.' But the way I look at it... people will like your next album if it's a kick-ass one." As with Alanis, Now Is the Time was released only in Canada and produced three top 40 singles—"An Emotion Away", the minor adult contemporary hit "No Apologies" as well as "(Change Is) Never a Waste of Time". The industry considered it a commercial failure, however, since it sold only a little more than half the copies of her first album. With her two-album deal with MCA Records Canada complete, Morissette was left without a major label contract.

1993–1997: Jagged Little Pill 
In 1993, Morissette's publisher Leeds Levy at MCA Music Publishing introduced her to manager Scott Welch. Welch told HitQuarters he was impressed by her "spectacular voice", her character and her lyrics. At the time she was still living at home with her parents. Together they decided it would be best for her career to move to Toronto and start writing with other people. After graduating from high school, Morissette moved from Ottawa to Toronto. Her publisher funded part of her development and when she met producer and songwriter Glen Ballard, he believed in her talent enough to let her use his studio. The two wrote and recorded Morissette's first internationally released album, Jagged Little Pill, and by the spring of 1995, she had signed a deal with Maverick Records. In the same year she learned how to play guitar. According to manager Welch, every label they approached, apart from Maverick, declined to sign Morissette.

Maverick Records released Jagged Little Pill internationally in June 1995. The album was expected only to sell enough for Morissette to make a follow-up, but the situation improved quickly when KROQ-FM, an influential Los Angeles modern rock radio station, began playing "You Oughta Know", the album's first single, featuring Flea and Dave Navarro from the Red Hot Chili Peppers. The song instantly garnered attention for its scathing, explicit lyrics, and a subsequent music video went into heavy rotation on MTV and MuchMusic.

After the success of "You Oughta Know", the album's other hits helped send Jagged Little Pill to the top of the charts. "All I Really Want" and "Hand in My Pocket" followed, and the fourth U.S. single, "Ironic", became Morissette's biggest hit. "You Learn" and "Head over Feet", the fifth and sixth singles, kept Jagged Little Pill (1995) in the top 20 on the Billboard 200 albums chart for more than a year. Jagged Little Pill sold more than 16 million copies in the U.S.; it sold 33 million worldwide, making it the second biggest-selling album by a female artist (behind Shania Twain's Come On Over).

Morissette's popularity grew significantly in Canada, where the album was certified twelve times platinum and produced four RPM chart-toppers: "Hand in My Pocket", "Ironic", "You Learn", and "Head over Feet". The album was also a bestseller in Australia and the United Kingdom.

Morissette's success with Jagged Little Pill (1995) was credited with opening doors for female singers such as Meredith Brooks, Tracy Bonham and Patti Rothberg, and later Avril Lavigne and Pink. She was criticized for collaborating with producer and supposed image-maker Ballard, and her previous disco pop albums also proved a hindrance for her respectability. Morissette and the album won six Juno Awards in 1996: Album of the Year, Single of the Year ("You Oughta Know"), Female Vocalist of the Year, Songwriter of the Year and Best Rock Album. At the 16th Brit Awards she won Brit Award for International Breakthrough Act. At the 38th Annual Grammy Awards in 1996, she won Best Female Rock Vocal Performance, Best Rock Song (both for "You Oughta Know"), Best Rock Album and Album of the Year. 

At the 1996 MTV Video Music Awards, she also won Best New Artist in a Video and Best Female Video, and was nominated for Viewer's Choice, Best Direction in a Video and Video of the Year. All nominations were for the video of Ironic. She performed instead "Your House". 

Following the album release in 1995, Morissette embarked on an 18-month world tour in support of Jagged Little Pill, beginning in small clubs and ending in large venues. Taylor Hawkins, who later joined the Foo Fighters, was the tour's drummer and Radiohead joined as the opening act in the summer of 1996. "Ironic" was nominated for two 1997 Grammy Awards—Record of the Year and Best Music Video, Short Form—and won Single of the Year at the 1997 Juno Awards, where Morissette also won Songwriter of the Year and the International Achievement Award. The video Jagged Little Pill, Live, which was co-directed by Morissette and is about the bulk of her tour won a 1998 Grammy Award for Best Music Video, Long Form.

Following the tour, Morissette began practicing Iyengar Yoga for balance. After the last December 1996 show, she went to India for six weeks, accompanied by her mother, two aunts and two friends. The trip left her with an indelible impression and set the cornerstone for the concept of her next album.

1998–2000: Supposed Former Infatuation Junkie and Alanis Unplugged 

Morissette was featured as a guest vocalist on Ringo Starr's cover of "Drift Away" on his 1998 album, Vertical Man, and on the songs "Don't Drink the Water" and "Spoon" on the Dave Matthews Band album Before These Crowded Streets. She recorded the song "Uninvited" for the soundtrack to the 1998 film City of Angels. Although the track was never commercially released as a single, it received widespread radio airplay in the U.S. At the 1999 Grammy Awards, it won in the categories of Best Rock Song and Best Female Rock Vocal Performance, and was nominated for Best Song Written for a Motion Picture, Television or Other Visual Media. Later in 1998, Morissette released her fourth album, Supposed Former Infatuation Junkie, which she wrote and produced with Glen Ballard.

The label hoped to sell 1 million copies of the album on initial release; instead, it debuted at number one on the Billboard 200 chart with first-week sales of 469,000 copies—a record, at the time, for the highest first-week sales of an album by a female artist. The wordy, personal lyrics on Supposed Former Infatuation Junkie alienated many fans, and after the album sold considerably less than Jagged Little Pill (1995), many labelled it an example of the sophomore jinx. However, it received positive reviews, including a four-star review from Rolling Stone. In Canada, it won the Juno Award for Best Album and was certified four times platinum. "Thank U", the album's only major international hit single, was nominated for the 2000 Grammy Award for Best Female Pop Vocal Performance; the music video, which featured Morissette nude, generated mild controversy. Morissette herself directed the videos for "Unsent" and "So Pure", which won, respectively, the MuchMusic Video Award for Best Director and the Juno Award for Video of the Year.

Morissette contributed vocals to "Mercy", where she paid homage to her roots by singing in Hungarian, "Hope", "Innocence" and "Faith", four tracks on Jonathan Elias's project The Prayer Cycle, which was released in 1999. The same year, she released the live acoustic album Alanis Unplugged, which was recorded during her appearance on the television show MTV Unplugged. It featured tracks from her previous two albums alongside four new songs, including "King of Pain" (a cover of The Police song) and "No Pressure over Cappuccino", which Morissette wrote with her main guitar player, Nick Lashley. The recording of the Supposed Former Infatuation Junkie track "That I Would Be Good", released as a single, became a minor hit on hot adult contemporary radio in America. Also in 1999, Morissette released a live version of her song "Are You Still Mad" on the charity album Live in the X Lounge II. For her live rendition of "So Pure" at Woodstock '99, she was nominated for Best Female Rock Vocal Performance at the 2001 Grammy Awards. During the summer of 1999, Morissette toured with singer-songwriter Tori Amos on the 5 and a Half Weeks Tour in support of Amos' album To Venus and Back (1999).

2001–2005: Under Rug Swept and So-Called Chaos 
In 2001, Morissette was featured with Stephanie McKay on the Tricky song "Excess", which is on his album Blowback. Morissette released her fifth studio album, Under Rug Swept, in February 2002. For the first time in her career, she took on the role of sole writer and producer of an album. Her band, comprising Joel Shearer, Nick Lashley, Chris Chaney, and Gary Novak, played the majority of the instruments; additional contributions came from Eric Avery, Dean DeLeo, Flea, and Meshell Ndegeocello.

Under Rug Swept debuted at number one on the Billboard 200 chart, eventually going platinum in Canada and selling one million copies in the U.S. It produced the hit single "Hands Clean", which topped the Canadian Singles Chart and received substantial radio play; for her work on "Hands Clean" and "So Unsexy", Morissette won a Juno Award for Producer of the Year. A second single, "Precious Illusions", was released, but it did not garner significant success outside Canada or U.S. hot AC radio.

Later in 2002, Morissette released the combination package Feast on Scraps, which includes a DVD of live concert and backstage documentary footage directed by her and a CD containing eight previously unreleased songs from the Under Rug Swept recording sessions. Preceded by the single "Simple Together", it sold roughly 70,000 copies in the U.S. and was nominated for a Juno Award for Music DVD of the Year.

Morissette hosted the Juno Awards of 2004 dressed in a bathrobe, which she took off to reveal a flesh-colored bodysuit, a response to the era of censorship in the U.S. caused by Janet Jackson's breast-flash incident during the Super Bowl XXXVIII halftime show. Morissette released her sixth studio album, So-Called Chaos, in May 2004. She wrote the songs on her own again, and co-produced the album with Tim Thorney and pop music producer John Shanks. The album debuted at number five on the Billboard 200 chart to generally mixed critical reviews, and it became Morissette's lowest seller in the U.S. The lead single, "Everything", achieved major success on Adult Top 40 radio in America and was moderately popular elsewhere, particularly in Canada, although it failed to reach the top 40 on the U.S. Hot 100. Because the first line of the song includes the word "asshole", American radio stations refused to play it, and the single version was changed to include the word "nightmare" instead. Unhappy that U.S. radio networks had required her to change a word in the song, Canadian radio played the unaltered version, with Morissette stating at the 2004 Juno Awards in Canada: "Well, I am overjoyed to be back in my homeland, the true North, strong and censor-free." Two other singles, "Out Is Through" and "Eight Easy Steps", fared considerably worse, although a dance mix of "Eight Easy Steps" was a U.S. club hit. Morissette embarked on a U.S. summer tour with long-time friends and fellow Canadians Barenaked Ladies, working with the non-profit environmental organization Reverb.

To commemorate the 10th anniversary of Jagged Little Pill (1995), Morissette released a studio acoustic version, Jagged Little Pill Acoustic, in June 2005. The album was released exclusively through Starbucks' Hear Music retail concept through their coffee shops for a six-week run. The limited availability led to a dispute between Maverick Records and HMV North America, who retaliated by removing Morissette's other albums from sale for the duration of Starbucks's exclusive six-week sale. , Jagged Little Pill Acoustic had sold 372,000 copies in the U.S., and a video for "Hand in My Pocket" received rotation on VH1 in America. The accompanying tour ran for two months in mid-2005, with Morissette playing small theatre venues. During the same period, Morissette was inducted into Canada's Walk of Fame. The singer opened for The Rolling Stones for a few dates of their A Bigger Bang Tour in the autumn of 2005.

Morissette released the greatest hits album Alanis Morissette: The Collection in late 2005. The lead single and only new track, a cover of Seal's "Crazy", was an Adult Top 40 and dance hit in the U.S., but achieved only minimal chart success elsewhere. A limited edition of The Collection features a DVD including a documentary with videos of two unreleased songs from Morissette's 1996 Can't Not Tour: "King of Intimidation" and "Can't Not". (A reworked version of "Can't Not" had also appeared on Supposed Former Infatuation Junkie.) The DVD also includes a ninety-second clip of the unreleased video for the single "Joining You". , The Collection had sold 373,000 copies in the U.S., according to Nielsen SoundScan. That same year, Morissette contributed the song "Wunderkind" to the soundtrack of the film The Chronicles of Narnia: The Lion, the Witch and the Wardrobe, and she was nominated for a Golden Globe Award for Best Original Song.

2006–2010: Flavors of Entanglement 
2006 marked the first year in Morissette's musical career without a single concert appearance showcasing her own songs, with the exception of an appearance on The Tonight Show with Jay Leno in January when she performed "Wunderkind".

On April 1, 2007, Morissette released a tongue-in-cheek cover of The Black Eyed Peas's selection "My Humps", which she recorded in a slow, mournful voice, accompanied only by a piano. The accompanying YouTube-hosted video, in which she dances provocatively with a group of men and hits the ones who act as if attempting to touch her breasts, had received 16,465,653 views as of February 15, 2009. Morissette did not take any interviews for a time to explain the song, and it was theorized that she did it as an April Fools' Day joke. Black Eyed Peas vocalist Stacy "Fergie" Ferguson responded by sending Morissette a buttocks-shaped cake with an approving note. On the verge of the release of her following album, she finally elaborated on how the video came to be, citing that she became very much emotionally loaded while recording her new songs one after the other and one day she wished she could do a simple song like "My Humps" and the joke just took a life of its own.

Morissette performed at a gig for The Nightwatchman, a.k.a. Tom Morello of Rage Against the Machine and Audioslave, at the Hotel Café in Los Angeles in April 2007. The following June, she performed "The Star-Spangled Banner" and "O Canada", the American and Canadian national anthems, in Game 4 of the Stanley Cup Finals between the Ottawa Senators and the Anaheim Ducks in Ottawa, Ontario. (The NHL requires arenas to perform both the American and Canadian national anthems at games involving teams from both countries.) In early 2008, Morissette participated in a tour with Matchbox Twenty and Mutemath as a special guest.

Morissette's seventh studio album, Flavors of Entanglement, which was produced by Guy Sigsworth, was released in mid-2008. She has stated that in late 2008, she would embark on a North American headlining tour, but in the meantime she would be promoting the album internationally by performing at shows and festivals and making television and radio appearances. The album's first single was "Underneath", a video for which was submitted to the 2007 Elevate Film Festival, the purpose of which festival was to create documentaries, music videos, narratives and shorts regarding subjects to raise the level of human consciousness on the earth. On October 3, 2008, Morissette released the video for her latest single, "Not as We".

Morissette contributed to 1 Giant Leap, performing "Arrival" with Zap Mama and she has released an acoustic version of her song "Still" as part of a compilation from Music for Relief in support of the 2010 Haiti earthquake crisis. In 2008 she contributed a recording of "Versions of Violence" for the album Songs for Tibet: The Art of Peace to promote peace. Morissette has also recorded a cover of the 1984 Willie Nelson and Julio Iglesias hit, "To All the Girls I've Loved Before", re-written as "To All the Boys I've Loved Before". Nelson played rhythm guitar on the recording. In April 2010, Morissette released the song "I Remain", which she wrote for the Prince of Persia: The Sands of Time soundtrack. On May 26, 2010, the season finale of American Idol, Morissette performed a duet of her song "You Oughta Know" with Runner Up Crystal Bowersox. Morissette left Maverick Records after all promotion for Flavors was completed.

2011–2016: Havoc and Bright Lights and Jagged Little Pill 20th anniversary 

On November 20, 2011, Morissette appeared at the American Music Awards. When asked about the new album during a short interview, she said she had recorded 31 songs, and that the album would "likely be out next year, probably [in] summertime". On December 21, 2011, Morissette performed a duet of "Uninvited" with finalist Josh Krajcik during the performance finale of the X-Factor.

Morissette embarked on a European tour for the summer of 2012, according to Alanis.com. In early May 2012, a new song called "Magical Child" appeared on a Starbucks compilation called Every Mother Counts.

On May 2, 2012, Morissette revealed through her Facebook account that her eighth studio album, entitled Havoc and Bright Lights, would be released in August 2012, on new label Collective Sounds, distributed by Sony's RED Distribution. On the same day, Billboard specified the date as August 28 and revealed the album would contain twelve tracks. The album's lead single, "Guardian", was released on iTunes on May 15, 2012, and hit the radio airwaves four days prior to this. The single had minor success in North America, charting the Billboard Bubbling Under Hot 100 Singles in the US and almost reaching the top 40 in Canada. However, the song did become a hit in several countries in Europe. "Receive", the second single off the album, was released early December the same year.Morissette received the UCLA Spring Sing's George and Ira Gershwin Award on May 16, 2014, at Pauley Pavilion. On her website starting in the summer of 2014, in celebration of her fortieth birthday, the LP record for her song "Big Sur" was offered for sale, which was previously available on the Target edition of her 2012 album, Havoc and Bright Lights. July 25, 2014, was the start of the ten-show Intimate and Acoustic tour. In 2015, she was named to the Canadian Music Hall of Fame.

In celebration of the twentieth anniversary of the release of Jagged Little Pill, a new four-disc collector's edition was released on October 30, 2015. The four-disc edition includes remastered audio of the original album as well as an entire disc of 10 unreleased demos from the era, handpicked by Morissette from her archives, offering a deeper and more personal look at the classic album. Also included is a previously unreleased concert from 1995 as well as 2005's Jagged Little Pill Acoustic.

2017–present: Such Pretty Forks in the Road and meditation album 
While on tour in August 2017, Morissette teased a song which would become known as "I Miss The Band". On October 27, 2017, she premiered a new song entitled "Rest", which was released officially in May 2021, and performed "Castle of Glass" with members of the band No Doubt and Mike Shinoda at the Linkin Park and Friends – Celebrate Life in Honor of Chester Bennington memorial concert. In November 2017, she tweeted that she was writing 22 songs with Michael Farrell.

On March 16, 2018, Morissette performed a new song called "Ablaze" during her 2018 tour. In October 2018, she revealed on social media that she had written 23 new songs, and hinted at a new album with hashtag "#alanismorissettenewrecord2019", after a six-year hiatus. Song titles from the writing session include "Reckoning", "Diagnosis", "Her" and "Legacy". On May 5, 2018, Jagged Little Pill, a jukebox musical featuring Morissette's songs, premiered in Cambridge, Massachusetts, at the American Repertory Theater. Morissette contributed two new songs to the musical, "Smiling" and "Predator". The musical transferred to Broadway in fall of 2019, starting previews on November 3 and opening on December 5 at the Broadhurst Theatre. The production received fifteen Tony Award nominations, the most of any production that season.

In June 2019, Morissette went into the studio in Los Angeles. According to an interview, she had written all the songs, and "Smiling" would be included on the new album, likely to be released early 2020. On August 8, 2019, she revealed that the new album was produced by Alex Hope and Catherine Marks. On December 1, 2019, Morissette announced her first studio album in eight years, Such Pretty Forks in the Road, set for release on May 1, 2020. The first single off the record, "Reasons I Drink", was released on December 2, 2019.

Morissette was featured on Halsey's song "Alanis' Interlude", released on January 17, 2020. On February 5, 2020, she revealed that her upcoming album was mixed by Chris Dugan. The second single from the album, "Smiling", was released on February 20, 2020. On April 15, 2020, Morissette announced that the album's release would be postponed due to concerns over the COVID-19 pandemic. It was released on July 31, 2020.

Morissette was originally scheduled to embark on a world tour for 25th anniversary of Jagged Little Pill in June 2020 with Garbage and Liz Phair, both already opened for Morissette in 1999 during Junkie Tour. The latter cancelled her shows in North America and was replaced by Cat Power instead. Due to COVID-19 pandemic, the tour was postponed to summer 2021. Beth Orton announced that she will join to UK and Europe leg of the summer tour 2022.

On May 18, 2022, Morissette premiered the new track Safety-Empath in Paradise. The new album of meditation music titled The Storm Before the Calm was released on June 17, 2022.

Acting career 
In 1986, Morissette had her first stint as an actress in five episodes of the children's television show You Can't Do That on Television. She appeared on stage with the Orpheus Musical Theatre Society in 1985 and 1988.

In 1999, Morissette delved into acting again, for the first time since 1993, appearing as God in the Kevin Smith comedy Dogma and contributing the song "Still" to its soundtrack. Morissette reprised her role as God for a post-credits scene in Smith's next film, Jay and Silent Bob Strike Back, to literally close the book on the View Askewniverse. She also appeared in the hit HBO comedies Sex and the City and Curb Your Enthusiasm, appeared in the play The Vagina Monologues, and had brief cameos playing herself in the Brazilian hit soap operas Celebridade and Malhação.

In late 2003, Morissette appeared in the Off-Broadway play The Exonerated as Sunny Jacobs, a death row inmate freed after proof surfaced that she was innocent. In April 2006, MTV News reported that Morissette would reprise her role in The Exonerated in London from May 23 until May 28.

She expanded her acting credentials with the July 2004 release of the Cole Porter biographical film De-Lovely, in which she performed the song "Let's Do It (Let's Fall in Love)" and had a brief role as an anonymous stage performer. In February 2005, she made a guest appearance on the Canadian television show Degrassi: The Next Generation with Dogma co-star Jason Mewes and director Kevin Smith. Also in 2005, Morissette, then engaged to Ryan Reynolds, made a cameo appearance as "herself" as a former client of Reynolds' character in the film Just Friends. This scene was deleted from the theatrical release, and is only available on the DVD.

In 2006, she guest-starred in an episode of Lifetime's Lovespring International as a homeless woman named Lucinda, three episodes of FX's Nip/Tuck, playing a lesbian named Poppy, and the mockumentary-documentary Pittsburgh as herself.

Morissette appeared in eight episodes of Weeds, playing Dr. Audra Kitson, a "no-nonsense obstetrician" who treats pregnant main character Nancy Botwin. Her first episode aired in July 2009. 

In early 2010, Morissette returned to the stage, performing a one-night engagement in An Oak Tree, an experimental play in Los Angeles. The performance was a sell-out. In April 2010, Morissette was confirmed to be in the cast of season six of Weeds season six again portraying Dr. Audra Kitson.

Morissette also starred in a film adaptation of Philip K. Dick's novel Radio Free Albemuth. Morissette plays Sylvia, an ordinary woman in unexpected remission from lymphoma. Morissette stated that she is "...a big fan of Philip K. Dick's poetic and expansively imaginative books" and that she "feel[s] blessed to portray Sylvia, and to be part of this story being told in film".

She appeared as Amanda, a former bandmate of main character Ava Alexander (played by Maya Rudolph), in one episode of NBC's Up All Night on February 16, 2012. Rudolph officiated as minister for Morissette's wedding with both performing the explicit version of their hit hip hop song "Back It Up (Beep Beep)".

In 2014, Morissette played the role of Marisa Damia, the lover of architect and designer Eileen Gray, in the film The Price of Desire, directed by Mary McGuckian.

In 2021, Morissette was featured as a recurring character on adult-animation show The Great North.

Other work 
In October 2015, Conversation with Alanis Morissette features conversations with different individuals from different schools and walks of life discussing everything from psychology to art to spirituality to design to health and well-being, to relationships (whether they be romantic or colleagueship or parent with children relationships). The monthly podcast is currently available to download on iTunes and free to listen to on YouTube.

In January 2016, she began a short-lived advice column in The Guardian newspaper.

In May 2018, the American Repertory Theater (Cambridge, Massachusetts) premiered Jagged Little Pill, a musical with music by Morissette and Glen Ballard, lyrics by Morissette, book by Diablo Cody, and directed by Diane Paulus.

Jagged, a documentary film about Morissette and Jagged Little Pill by filmmaker Alison Klayman, premiered at the 2021 Toronto International Film Festival before airing on HBO as part of the Music Box series of documentary films about music history.

Personal life 
Morissette was raised in a devout Roman Catholic family in Canada. She became a US citizen in 2005, while retaining her Canadian citizenship. Morissette has since then been practising Buddhism.

Throughout her teen years and 20s, Morissette had depression and various eating disorders. She recovered from them and started to eat a healthier diet. In 2009, she ran a marathon promoting awareness for the National Eating Disorders Association.

In the 2021 documentary Jagged, Morissette said men committed statutory rape offenses against her when she was 15 years old.

Over seven years, Morissette's business manager Jonathan Schwartz stole over $5 million from her. He confessed to doing so in April 2017 and was sentenced to six years in prison.

On October 22, 2019, Morissette shared her nearly decade-long experience with postpartum depression on CBS This Morning.

In 1996, Morissette bought a home in Brentwood, Los Angeles. She also had an apartment in Ottawa and a home in Malibu, the latter of which was partially destroyed in the Woolsey Fire. In 2019, she and her family moved to Northern California; she said in an interview with The New York Times that she was "finally done with living in Los Angeles".

Relationships 
Morissette dated actor and comedian Dave Coulier for a short time in the early 1990s. In a 2008 interview, Coulier said he was the ex-boyfriend who inspired Morissette's song "You Oughta Know"; Morissette has not commented on the subject of the song.

Morissette met Canadian actor Ryan Reynolds at Drew Barrymore's birthday party in 2002, and the couple began dating soon afterwards. They announced their engagement in June 2004. In February 2007, representatives for Morissette and Reynolds announced they had decided to end their engagement. Morissette has said that her album Flavors of Entanglement was created out of her grief after the breakup, saying "it was cathartic."

On May 22, 2010, Morissette married rapper Mario "Souleye" Treadway in a private ceremony at their Los Angeles home. The couple have three children: son Ever born in 2010; daughter Onyx born in 2016;
and another son Winter born in 2019.

Discography

 Alanis (1991)
 Now Is the Time (1992)
 Jagged Little Pill (1995)
 Supposed Former Infatuation Junkie (1998)
 Under Rug Swept (2002)
 So-Called Chaos (2004)
 Flavors of Entanglement (2008)
 Havoc and Bright Lights (2012)
 Such Pretty Forks in the Road (2020)
 The Storm Before the Calm (2022)

Awards and nominations

Filmography

Film

Television

Stage

Tours 
Opening act
 To the Extreme Tour (1991) (opening act for Vanilla Ice)
 1999 Summer Tour (1999) (opening act for Dave Matthews Band–Denver)
 A Bigger Bang Tour (2005) (opening act for The Rolling Stones)

Headlining
 Jagged Little Tour (1995) 
 Intellectual Intercourse Tour (1995–96)
 Can't Not Tour (1996) featuring Radiohead 
 Dhanyavad Tour (1998)
 Junkie Tour (1999) featuring Garbage and Liz Phair
 One Tour (2000)
 Under Rug Swept Tour (2001)
 Toward Our Union Mended Tour (2002)
 All I Really Want Tour (2003)
 So-Called Chaos Tour (2004)
 Diamond Wink Tour (2005) featuring Jason Mraz 
 Jagged Little Pill Acoustic Tour (2005)
 Flavors of Entanglement Tour (2008–09)
 Guardian Angel Tour (2012)
 Intimate and Acoustic (2014)
 World Tour (2018)
 2021 World Tour: Celebrating 25 Years of Jagged Little Pill featuring Garbage, Cat Power and Beth Orton (2021–22)

Co-headlining
 5 ½ Weeks Tour (1999) (with Tori Amos)
 Au Naturale Tour (2004) (with the Barenaked Ladies)
 Exile in America Tour (2008) (with Matchbox Twenty)

See also 

 Canadian rock
 Music of Canada
 List of diamond-certified albums in Canada
 List of best-selling albums

References

Further reading 

 Rock on the Net 
 [ "Alanis Morissette – Artist Chart History"]. Billboard. Retrieved August 23, 2006.
 [ "Alanis Morissette – Billboard Singles"]. Allmusic. Retrieved August 23, 2006.
 Rock Chicks:The Hottest Female Rockers from the 1960s to Now by Stieven-Taylor, Alison (2007). Sydney. Rockpool Publishing.

External links 

 
 

 
1974 births
20th-century Canadian actresses
20th-century Canadian guitarists
20th-century Canadian women singers
20th-century Canadian women writers
21st-century American actresses
21st-century American singers
21st-century American women guitarists
21st-century American guitarists
21st-century American women singers
21st-century American women writers
21st-century Buddhists
21st-century Canadian actresses
21st-century Canadian guitarists
21st-century Canadian women singers
21st-century Canadian women writers
Living people
Actresses from Los Angeles
Actresses from Ottawa
Alternative rock singers
American Buddhists
American dance musicians
American women pop singers
American women rock singers
American women singer-songwriters
American feminists
American film actresses
American harmonica players
American mezzo-sopranos
American music video directors
American people of French descent
American people of Hungarian-Jewish descent
American people of Irish descent
American rock songwriters
American stage actresses
American television actresses
American women record producers
Brit Award winners
Canadian child actresses
Canadian dance musicians
Canadian emigrants to the United States
Canadian women pop singers
Canadian women rock singers
Canadian women singer-songwriters
Canadian feminists
Canadian film actresses
Canadian harmonica players
Canadian mezzo-sopranos
Canadian Music Hall of Fame inductees
Canadian music video directors
Canadian people of Hungarian-Jewish descent
Canadian people of Irish descent
Canadian record producers
Canadian Buddhists
Canadian stage actresses
Canadian television actresses
Canadian twins
Canadian women guitarists
Canadian women record producers
Child pop musicians
Echo (music award) winners
Female music video directors
Feminist musicians
Former Roman Catholics
Franco-Ontarian people
Fraternal twin actresses
Grammy Award winners
Guitarists from California
Jack Richardson Producer of the Year Award winners
Juno Award for Adult Contemporary Album of the Year winners
Juno Award for Album of the Year winners
Juno Award for Artist of the Year winners
Juno Award for Breakthrough Artist of the Year winners
Juno Award for Pop Album of the Year winners
Juno Award for Rock Album of the Year winners
Juno Award for Single of the Year winners
Juno Award for Songwriter of the Year winners
Juno Award for Video of the Year winners
Juno International Achievement Award winners
Maverick Records artists
MCA Records artists
MTV Europe Music Award winners
Musicians from Ottawa
Naturalized citizens of the United States
People from Brentwood, Los Angeles
Record producers from Los Angeles
Singers from Los Angeles
Twin musicians
Warner Music Group artists
Women post-grunge singers
Women rock singers
Writers from Los Angeles
Writers from Ottawa
Singer-songwriters from California